Charles Pickel (born 15 May 1997) is a Swiss professional footballer who plays as a defensive midfielder for  club Cremonese.

Club career
Pickel started his youth football with FC Solothurn. In Summer 2011, he transferred to the youth department of FC Basel and played in their U-16 and advanced via their U-17 and U-18 team to their U-21 team in 2015. On 23 December 2015, he signed a two and a half year professional contract, but remained with the U-21 team. On 16 May 2016, Pickel was called up to the first team by head coach Urs Fischer. He played his Swiss Super League debut for the Basel first team in the starting eleven, but Basel suffered a 0–4 away defeat against Luzern. Basel won the Swiss Super League championship at the end of the 2015–16 Super League season. For the club it was the seventh title in a row and their 19th championship title in total.

Pickel joined Basel's first team definitively for their 2016–17 season under head coach Urs Fischer. Although he appeared in ten test matches, he played only one more league match, with the team in the home game in the St. Jakob-Park on 4 February 2017 as Basel won 4–0 against Lugano. Basel announced on 1 March that Pickel was leaving the club. With the U-21 Pickel had played 38 goals scoring three goals. During in short time with Basel's first team Pickel played a total of 13 games without scoring a goal. Three of these games were in the Swiss Super League and ten were friendly games.

On 1 March 2017, Basel announced that Pickel had signed for Grasshopper Club. GC announced that he had signed a four and a half year contract with them.  Pickel played his debut for his new club on 5 March 2017 in the Swissporarena in the starting eleven against Luzern. He played the entire game and it ended in a 1–1 draw.

On 1 July 2019 GC announced that Pickel was transferring to Grenoble.

On 22 July 2022, it was announced that Pickel had joined newly promoted Serie A club Cremonese.

International career
Born in Switzerland, Pickel is of Congolese and Swiss descent. Pickel played one international game for the Swiss U-15. He played his debut for the Swiss U-18 as midfielder on 2 September 2014 as they drew 2–2 with the Swedish U-18. He played his debut for the Swiss U-19 as defender on 1 September 2015 as they drew 1–1 with Portugal U-19. His last game for the Switzerland U-20 was on 27 March 2018 in the away game against Italy U-20, where Pickel played as right-back and the Swiss won 3–2.

Honours
FC Basel
 Swiss Super League: 2015–16, 2016–17

External links
 
 Profile season 2015/16 on the Swiss Football League homepage

References

1997 births
Living people
People from Solothurn
Swiss people of Democratic Republic of the Congo descent
Sportspeople from the canton of Solothurn
Swiss men's footballers
Association football defenders
Association football midfielders
Switzerland youth international footballers
Swiss Super League players
Ligue 2 players
Primeira Liga players
Serie A players
FC Basel players
Grasshopper Club Zürich players
FC Schaffhausen players
Neuchâtel Xamax FCS players
Grenoble Foot 38 players
F.C. Famalicão players
U.S. Cremonese players
Swiss expatriate footballers
Expatriate footballers in France
Swiss expatriate sportspeople in France
Expatriate footballers in Portugal
Swiss expatriate sportspeople in Portugal
Expatriate footballers in Italy
Swiss expatriate sportspeople in Italy